David Cubitt (born 18 March 1965) is an English-born Canadian television actor.

Born in England in 1965 to a Dutch mother, Jette, and an English father, David, he moved with his parents to Vancouver, British Columbia when he was six months old. He studied at Studio 58 there. He has starred in the Canadian series Traders and the American series Robbery Homicide Division.

He appeared as Det. Lee Scanlon in the NBC series Medium.  He first appeared in season 1 and appeared until the show was cancelled. He appeared in the NBC disaster miniseries 10.5 and 10.5: Apocalypse, and made his film debut in Alive: The Miracle of the Andes (1993), co-starring Ethan Hawke.

Filmography

Film

Television

Awards

References

External links

1965 births
Living people
Canadian people of Dutch descent
Canadian people of English descent
Canadian male television actors
20th-century Canadian male actors
21st-century Canadian male actors
Male actors from Vancouver
Best Actor in a Drama Series Canadian Screen Award winners